Nerthra stygica is a species of toad bug in the family Gelastocoridae. It is found in North America.

References

Articles created by Qbugbot
Insects described in 1832
Gelastocoridae